The 1996 Minnesota Golden Gophers football team represented the University of Minnesota in the 1996 NCAA Division I-A football season. In their fourth year under head coach Jim Wacker, the Golden Gophers compiled a 4–7 record and were outscored by their opponents by a combined total of 340 to 236.

Linebacker Luke Braaten, offensive tackle James Elizondo, offensive guard Pat Hau, quarterback Rob Jones, long snapper Derek Rackley, cornerback Fred Rodgers, quarterback Cory Sauter, linebacker Jim Tallman, linebacker Parc Williams and quarterback Spergon Wynn were named Academic All-Big Ten.

Wide receiver Ryan Thelwell and offensive tackle Gann Brooks were awarded the Bronko Nagurski Award.  Wide receiver Tutu Atwell was awarded the Bruce Smith Award.  Parc Williams was awarded the Carl Eller Award.  Free safety Rishon Early was awarded the Bobby Bell Award.  Cory Sauter was awarded the Butch Nash Award.  Defensive tackle  Jerome Davis was awarded the Paul Giel Award.

Total attendance for the season was 261,113, which averaged out to 43,519 per game.  The season high for attendance was again rival Iowa.

Schedule

Roster

References

Minnesota
Minnesota Golden Gophers football seasons
Minnesota Golden Gophers football